Yavir Yavoriv is an ice hockey team in Yavoriv, Ukraine, that is currently playing in the Western Ukrainian Amateur Hockey League. During the 2009-10 season, the club participated in Division C (the Western Group) of the Ukrainian Hockey League. They finished in fifth place in the group with a record of three wins and seven losses, with 34 goals for and 40 against.

Achievements
WUAHL champion (1): 2012.

References

External links
Team profile on hockeyarenas.net
Team profile on eurohockey.com

Ice hockey teams in Ukraine
Sport in Lviv Oblast